Pseudlepista atriceps is a moth in the subfamily Arctiinae. It was described by Per Olof Christopher Aurivillius in 1921 and is found in Kenya.

References

Arctiidae genus list at Butterflies and Moths of the World of the Natural History Museum

Moths described in 1921
Lithosiini